Heat shock protein beta-2 is a protein that in humans is encoded by the HSPB2 gene.

Interactions 

HSPB2 has been shown to interact with:
 CRYAB,
 HSPB8, 
 Myotonic dystrophy protein kinase  and
 TRAF6.

References

Further reading